DataLink Institute is a non-profit tertiary institution founded in 1993 by Ernest Ansah as a charitable education institute. It was fully transformed into a leading university college that offers programs leading to degrees, university access programs and certificates in other disciplines.

The institute has five campuses: Main Campus, Tema, at 5th Avenue, community Ten, Accra, Ho, Pre-university College. Takoradi, Kpando.??

Datalink Institute is affiliated with the Kwame Nkrumah University of Science and Technology in Ghana, the University of Northampton (United Kingdom).

It currently has schools of Computer Science, Business Administration and Graduate Studies.

References

External links 
 http://www.datalink.edu.gh/

Educational institutions established in 1993
Universities in Ghana
1993 establishments in Ghana